Nothofagus macrocarpa, commonly known as roble de Santiago or Santiago's oak, is a deciduous tree in the Nothofagaceae family that is endemic to the mountains of central Chile.
It is sometimes regarded as a subspecies of Nothofagus obliqua. N. macrocarpa proposed to be renamed Lophozonia macrocarpa in 2013.

References

Nothofagaceae
Flora of central Chile
Ornamental trees
Fagales of Chile